Lewis Emerson Rader, Sr. (March 16, 1864 – May 11, 1910) was an American politician in the state of Washington. He served in the Washington House of Representatives. In 1910, Rader was starved to death after a 29-day fast under the advice of the quack doctor Linda Burfield Hazzard for treatment of a stomach issue.

References

1864 births
1910 deaths
People from Cumberland County, Illinois
Members of the Washington House of Representatives
19th-century American politicians
Victims of serial killers